Patrick James Delaney (born 1940) is a Scottish former footballer who played for several clubs, primarily Motherwell and Airdrieonians, as a central defender – though he began his career as a centre forward and could also play at full-back. He was Motherwell's 'player of the year' in the 1964–65 season.

His father Jimmy Delaney and his nephew John Kennedy were also footballers, both of whom played for Celtic and Scotland.

References

1940 births
Date of birth uncertain
Living people
Scottish footballers
Footballers from North Lanarkshire
People from Cleland, North Lanarkshire
Association football central defenders
Scottish people of Irish descent
Douglas Water Thistle F.C. players
Dunfermline Athletic F.C. players
Motherwell F.C. players
Clyde F.C. players
Airdrieonians F.C. (1878) players
Clydebank F.C. (1965) players
Albion Rovers F.C. players
Scottish Football League players
Scottish Junior Football Association players